Thomas MacKnight may refer to:

 Thomas Macknight (1829–1899), Anglo-Irish newspaper editor, biographer and publisher
 Thomas MacKnight (minister) (1762–1836), Scottish minister, physicist, mathematician and geologist

See also
 Thomas McKnight (disambiguation)